Jon Kenworthy is a footballer who played as a winger in the Football League for Tranmere Rovers.

References

External links

1974 births
Living people
Sportspeople from St Asaph
Association football wingers
Welsh footballers
Tranmere Rovers F.C. players
Chester City F.C. players
Aberystwyth Town F.C. players
English Football League players
Wales under-21 international footballers